Best Before Records is a British boutique independent record label based in London, England.

Best Before Records's artists are generally considered Alternative, Pop Punk, alternative rock, but some also include elements of various genres of metal. Some of their most well-known artists include or included ACODA, Mutiny On The Bounty, 22, The Chapman Family, Sharks, Dananananaykroyd, Johnny Foreigner, The Pistolas, The Heights and in 2014 signing Death and the Penguin,  American Fangs and Press to MECO.

The label's functions include sourcing new artists, producing albums, marketing/promoting and securing international licensees in the North American, European, Australian and Asian markets. The company provides traditional record company services along with (for some) management, digital marketing/promotion, production and manufacturing services catered to each artists individual requirements.

History 
Best Before Records was launched in 2004 as part of a subsidy under the Channelfly and Mama Group corporate. In December 2009 Mama Group was acquired by HMV who had shown no interest in this part of the corporation therefore the label Best Before Records was taken over by label manager Anthony Shaw and became a fully independent label distributed by PIAS Entertainment Group in the UK and Europe.

After separating from its parent company, it continued to develop a strong label identity and effectively launching several new artist careers including ‘Dananananaykroyd’, ‘Johnny Foreigner’, 'The Heights' and ‘The Morning After Girls’. Taking on further bands like Sharks, 22, Mutiny On The Bounty, ACODA and most recently Death and the Penguin, American Fangs and Press to MECO.

In 2015, Best Before Records changed worldwide distribution to The Orchard and released several new albums.

Artists

Artists that have been signed, or are currently signed, to the label 
  Press to MECO
  22
  American Fangs
  ACODA.
  Dananananaykroyd 
  Death and the Penguin
  Johnny Foreigner (active with Alcopop! Records UK) 
  Mutiny On The Bounty
  Sharks
  The Chapman Family
  The Heights
  The Morning After Girls 
  The Pistolas

Releases

References 

British independent record labels
Companies based in the London Borough of Lambeth
Best Before Records artists
Alternative rock record labels
Indie rock record labels
Hardcore record labels